Pals of the Pecos is a 1941 American Western "Three Mesquiteers" B-movie directed by Lester Orlebeck.

Cast 
 Robert Livingston as Stony Brooke
 Bob Steele as Tucson Smith
 Rufe Davis as Lullaby Joslin
 June Johnson as June Burke
 Robert Winkler as Tim Burke
 Pat O'Malley as Dan Burke
 Dennis Moore as Larry Burke
 Robert Frazer as Stevens
 Roy Barcroft as Keno
 John Holland as Lawyer Buckley
 Tom London as Sheriff Jeff

References

External links 
 

1941 films
1941 Western (genre) films
American Western (genre) films
American black-and-white films
Republic Pictures films
Three Mesquiteers films
Films directed by Lester Orlebeck
1940s English-language films
1940s American films